Trap House 4 is the thirty-fifth solo mixtape by American rapper Gucci Mane. The project serves as a sequel to Trap House III (2013). The project was released on July 4, 2014, by 1017 Brick Squad Records and 101 Distribution. The project features guest appearances from Chief Keef, K Camp, Young Scooter and Fredo Santana. The project features production from Zaytoven, Drumma Boy, Mike WiLL Made-It, Southside, Kevin McCall, C4, Tarentino, Young Chop and Bankroll Clay, among others.

Track listing

Charts

References

2014 albums
Albums produced by Honorable C.N.O.T.E.
Gucci Mane albums
Sequel albums